The Population Genetics Group (or PopGroup, or PGG) is an annual meeting of population geneticists held in the UK since 1968. The meetings have been very influential in promoting population and evolutionary genetics in the UK, Europe, and elsewhere. There have been long-standing connections between the PopGroup meeting and the journal Heredity. In 2017 Heredity published a special issue to mark the 50th meeting of the PopGroup. 

The two and a half day meetings are held annually just before Christmas or in the new year at UK universities. Attendance is typically in the range of 190-250 participants. The meetings are characterised by a very informal atmosphere alongside scientific rigour.

PopGroup is a self-organising meeting, not part of any society or university, and with no formal membership. It is funded principally by participant conference fees, and is not for profit, though it has been additionally supported as a Sectional Interest Group by the Genetics Society.

The first meetings were held in January 1968 by a group of established population geneticists as an outgrowth of informal meetings on the evolutionary patterns of the snail Cepaea nemoralis. Programmes of the meetings reflect the changes in population genetics through that time, and are available on the Population Genetics Group website as PDFs.

Notes 
 Held virtually due to the Covid-19 Pandemic

References

External links
 Population Genetics Group

Genetics in the United Kingdom
Population genetics organizations